Syngman Rhee (26 March 1875 – 19 July 1965) was a South Korean politician who served as the first president of South Korea from 1948 to 1960.

Rhee was also the first and last president of the Provisional Government of the Republic of Korea from 1919 to his impeachment in 1925 and from 1947 to 1948. As President of South Korea, Rhee's government was characterised by authoritarianism, limited economic development, and in the late 1950s growing political instability and public opposition. Authoritarianism continued in South Korea after Rhee's resignation until 1987, except for a few short breaks.

Born in Hwanghae Province, Joseon, Rhee attended an American Methodist school, where he converted to Christianity. He became involved in anti-Japanese activities after the 1894–95 First Sino-Japanese War and was imprisoned in 1899. Released in 1904, he moved to the United States, where he obtained degrees from American universities and met President Theodore Roosevelt. After a brief 1910–12 return to Korea, he moved to Hawaii in 1913. From 1918 to 1924, he was promoted to several high positions in some Korean provisional governments and served as a representative of these to Western powers. He moved to Washington, D.C., in 1939. In 1945, he was returned to US-controlled Korea by the US military, and on 20 July 1948 he was elected President of the Republic of Korea by the National Assembly.

Rhee adopted a hardline anti-communist and pro-American stance as president. Early on in his presidency, his government put down a communist uprising on Jeju Island, and the Mungyeong and Bodo League massacres were committed against suspected communist sympathisers, leaving at least 100,000 people dead. Rhee was president during the outbreak of the Korean War (1950–1953), in which North Korea invaded South Korea. He refused to sign the armistice agreement that ended the war, wishing to have the peninsula reunited by force.

After the fighting ended, the country remained at a low level economically, lagging behind North Korea, and was heavily reliant on U.S. aid. After being re-elected in 1956, the constitution was modified to remove the two-term restriction, despite protests from the opposition. He was elected uncontested in March 1960, after his opponent Chough Pyung-ok died before voting day. After Rhee's ally Lee Ki-poong won the corresponding vice-presidential election by a wide margin, the opposition rejected the result as rigged, which triggered protests. These escalated into the student-led April Revolution when police shot demonstrators in Masan, which forced Rhee to resign on 26 April and ultimately led to the establishment of the Second Republic of Korea. On 28 April, as protesters converged on the presidential palace, the CIA covertly flew him out to Honolulu, Hawaii, where he spent the rest of his life in exile. He died of a stroke in 1965.

Early life and career

Early life 
Syngman Rhee was born on 26 March 1875 in Daegyeong, a village in Pyeongsan County, Hwanghae Province of Joseon-ruled Korea. Rhee was the third but only surviving son out of three brothers and two sisters (his two older brothers both died in infancy) in a rural family of modest means. Rhee's family traced its lineage back to King Taejong of Joseon, and was a 16th-generation descendant of Grand Prince Yangnyeong through his second son, Yi Heun who was known as Jangpyeong Dojeong (장평도정;長平都正). This case makes him a distant relative of the mid-Joseon military officer, Yi Sun-sin (not be confused with Admiral Yi Sun-sin). His mother was a member of Gimhae Kim clan.

In 1877, at the age of two-years-old, Rhee and his family moved to Seoul, where he had traditional Confucian education in various seodang in Nakdong and Dodong. When Rhee was six years old a smallpox infection rendered him virtually blind until he was treated with western medicine, possibly by a Japanese doctor. Rhee was portrayed as a potential candidate for the gwageo, the traditional Korean civil service examination, but in 1894 reforms abolished the gwageo system, and in April he enrolled in the Pai Chai School, an American Methodist school, where he converted to Christianity. Rhee studied English and sinhakmun. Near the end of 1895, he joined a Hyeopseong (Mutual Friendship) Club created by Seo Jae-pil, who returned from the United States after his exile following the Gapsin Coup. He worked as the head and the main writer of the newspapers Hyeopseong-hoe Hoebo and Maeil Shinmun, the latter being the first daily newspaper in Korea. During this period, Rhee earned money by teaching the Korean language to Americans. In 1895, Rhee graduated from Pai Chai School.

Independence activities 
Rhee became involved in Anti-Japanese circles after the end of the First Sino-Japanese War in 1895, which saw Joseon passed from the Chinese sphere of influence to the Japanese. Rhee was implicated in a plot to take revenge for the assassination of Empress Myeongseong, the wife of King Gojong who was assassinated by Japanese agents(known in korean history as the Chunsaengmun incident); however, a female American physician Georgiana E. Whiting helped him avoid the charges by disguising him as her patient and go to his sister's house. Rhee acted as one of the forerunners of the Korean independence movement through grassroots organizations such as the Hyeopseong Club and the Independence Club. Rhee organized several protests against corruption and the influences of the Japan and the Russian Empire. As a result, in November 1898, Rhee attained the rank of Uigwan in the Imperial Legislature, the Jungchuwon.

After entering civil service, Rhee was implicated in a plot to remove King Gojong from power through the recruitment of Park Yeong-hyo. As a result, Rhee was imprisoned in the Gyeongmucheong Prison in January 1899. Other sources place the year arrested as 1897 and 1898. Rhee attempted to escape on the 20th day of imprisonment but was caught and was sentenced to life imprisonment through the Pyeongniwon. He was imprisoned in the Hanseong Prison. In prison, Rhee translated and compiled The Sino–Japanese War Record, wrote The Spirit of Independence, compiled the New English–Korean Dictionary and wrote in the Imperial Newspaper. He was also tortured.

Political activities in home and abroad 

In 1904, Rhee was released from prison at the outbreak of the Russo-Japanese War with the help of Min Young-hwan. In November 1904, with the help of Min Yeong-hwan and Han Gyu-seol, Rhee moved to the United States. In August 1905, Rhee and Yun Byeong-gu met with the Secretary of State John Hay and U.S. President Theodore Roosevelt at peace talks in Portsmouth, New Hampshire and attempted unsuccessfully to convince the US to help preserve independence for Korea.

Rhee continued to stay in the United States; this move has been described as an "exile." He obtained a Bachelor of Arts from George Washington University in 1907, and a Master of Arts from Harvard University in 1908. In 1910, he obtained a PhD from Princeton University with the thesis "Neutrality as influenced by the United States".

In August 1910, Rhee returned to Japanese occupied Korea. He served as a YMCA coordinator and missionary. In 1912, Rhee was implicated in the 105-Man Incident, and was shortly arrested. However, he fled to the United States in 1912 with M. C. Harris's rationale that Rhee was going to participate in the general meeting of Methodists in Minneapolis as the Korean representative.

In the United States, Rhee attempted to convince Woodrow Wilson to help the people involved in the 105-Man Incident, but failed to bring any change. Soon afterwards, he met Park Yong-man, who was in Nebraska at the time. In February 1913, as a consequence of the meeting, he moved to Honolulu, Hawaii, and took over the Han-in Jung-ang Academy. In Hawaii, he began to publish the Pacific Ocean Magazine. In 1918, he established the Han-in Christian Church. During this period, he opposed Park Yong-man's stance on foreign relations of Korea and brought about a split in the community. In December 1918, he was chosen, along with Dr. Henry Chung DeYoung, as a Korean representative to the Paris Peace Conference in 1919 by the Korean National Association but they failed to obtain permission to travel to Paris. After giving up travelling to Paris, Rhee held the First Korean Congress in Philadelphia with Seo Jae-pil to make plans for future political activism concerning Korean independence.

Following the March 1st Movement in March 1919, Rhee discovered that he was appointed to the positions of foreign minister for the Korean 
Provisional Government in the Russian territory(), prime minister for the Provisional Government of the Republic of Korea in Shanghai, and a position equivalent to president for the Hanseong Provisional Government. In June, in the acting capacity of the President of the Republic of Korea, he notified the prime ministers and the chairmen of peace conferences of Korea's independence. On 25 August, Rhee established the Korean Commission to America and Europe in Washington, D.C. On 6 September, Rhee discovered that he had been appointed acting president for the Provisional Government in Shanghai. From December 1920 to May 1921, he moved to Shanghai and was the acting president for the Provisional Government.

However, Rhee failed to efficiently act in the capacity of Acting President due to conflicts inside the provisional government in Shanghai. In October 1920, he returned to the US to participate in the Washington Naval Conference. During the conference, he attempted to set the problem of Korean independence as part of the agenda and campaigned for independence but was unsuccessful. In September 1922, he returned to Hawaii to focus on publication, education, and religion. In November 1924, Rhee was appointed the position of president for life in the Korean Comrade Society.

In March 1925, Rhee was impeached as the president of the Provisional Government in Shanghai over allegations of misuse of power and was removed from office. Nevertheless, he continued to claim the position of president by referring to the Hanseong Provisional Government and continued independence activities through the Korean Commission to America and Europe. In the beginning of 1933, he participated in the League of Nations conference in Geneva to bring up the question of Korean independence.

In November 1939, Rhee and his wife left Hawaii for Washington, D.C. He focused on writing the book Japan Inside Out and published it during the summer of 1941. With the attack on Pearl Harbor and the consequent Pacific War, which began in December 1941, Rhee used his position as the chairman of the foreign relations department of the provisional government in Chongqing to convince President Franklin D. Roosevelt and the United States Department of State to approve the existence of the Korean provisional government. As part of this plan, he cooperated with anti-Japan strategies conducted by the U.S. Office of Strategic Services. In 1945, he participated in the United Nations Conference on International Organization as the leader of the Korean representatives to request the participation of the Korean provisional government.

Presidency (1948–1960)

Return to Korea and rise to power

After the surrender of Japan on 2 September 1945, Rhee was flown to Tokyo aboard a U.S. military aircraft. Over the objections of the Department of State, the U.S. military government allowed Rhee to return to Korea by providing him with a passport in October 1945, despite the refusal of the Department of State to issue Rhee with a passport. The British historian Max Hastings wrote that there was "at least a measure of corruption in the transaction" as the U.S. OSS agent Preston Goodfellow who provided Rhee with the passport that allowed him to return to Korea was apparently promised by Rhee that if he came to power, he would reward Goodfellow with commercial concessions." Following the independence of Korea and a secret meeting with Douglas MacArthur, Rhee was flown in mid-October 1945 to Seoul aboard MacArthur's personal airplane, The Bataan.

After the return to Korea, he assumed the posts of president of the Independence Promotion Central Committee, chairman of the Korean People's Representative Democratic Legislature, and president of the Headquarters for Unification. At this point, he was strongly anti-communist and opposed foreign intervention; he opposed the Soviet Union and the United States' proposal in the Moscow Conference (1945) to establish a trusteeship for Korea and the cooperation between the left-wing (communist) and the right-wing (nationalist) parties. He also refused to join the US-Soviet Joint Commission as well as the negotiations with the north.
 
For decades, the Korean independence movement was torn by factionalism and in-fighting, and most of the leaders of the independence movement hated each other as much as they hated the Japanese. Rhee, who had lived for decades in the United States, was a figure known only from afar in Korea, and therefore regarded as a more or less acceptable compromise candidate for the conservative factions. More importantly, Rhee spoke fluent English, whereas none of his rivals did, and therefore he was the Korean politician most trusted and favored by the American occupation government. The British diplomat Roger Makins later recalled, "the American propensity to go for a man rather than a movement — Giraud among the French in 1942, Chiang Kai-shek in China. Americans have always liked the idea of dealing with a foreign leader who can be identified as 'their man'. They are much less comfortable with movements." Makins further added the same was the case with Rhee, as very few Americans were fluent in Korean in the 1940s or knew much about Korea, and it was simply far easier for the American occupation government to deal with Rhee than to try to understand Korea. Rhee was "acerbic, prickly, uncompromising" and was regarded by the U.S. State Department, which long had dealings with him as "a dangerous mischief-maker", but the American General John R. Hodge decided that Rhee was the best man for the Americans to back because of his fluent English and his ability to talk with authority to American officers about American subjects. Once it became clear from October 1945 onward that Rhee was the Korean politician most favored by the Americans, other conservative leaders fell in behind him.
 
When the first U.S.–Soviet Cooperation Committee meeting was concluded without a result, he began to argue in June 1946 that the government of Korea must be established as an independent entity. In the same month, he created a plan based on this idea and moved to Washington, D.C. from December 1946 to April 1947 to lobby support for the plan. During the visit, Harry S. Truman's policies of Containment and the Truman Doctrine, which was announced in March 1947, enforced Rhee's anti-communist ideas.

In November 1947, the United Nations General Assembly recognized Korea's independence and established the United Nations Temporary Commission on Korea (UNTCOK) through Resolution 112. In May 1948, the South Korean Constitutional Assembly election was held under the oversight of the UNTCOK. He was elected without competition to serve in the South Korean Constitutional Assembly and was consequently selected to be Speaker of the Assembly. Rhee was highly influential in creating the policy stating that the president of South Korea had to be elected by the National Assembly. The 1948 Constitution of the Republic of Korea was adopted on 17 July 1948.

On 20 July 1948, Rhee was elected president of the Republic of Korea in the 1948 South Korean presidential election with 92.3% of the vote; the second candidate, Kim Gu, received 6.7% of the vote. On 15 August the Republic of Korea was formally established in South Korea and Rhee was inaugurated as the first President of the Republic of Korea. The next month, on 9 September, the north also proclaimed statehood as the Democratic People's Republic of Korea. Rhee himself had been an independence activist, and his relations with the chinilpa Korean elites who had collaborated with the Japanese were, in the words of the South Korean historian Kyung Moon Hwang, often "contentious", but in the end an understanding was reached in which, in exchange for their support, Rhee would not purge the elites. In particular, the Koreans who had served in the colonial-era National Police, whom the Americans had retained after August 1945, were promised by Rhee that their jobs would not be threatened by him. Upon independence in 1948, 53% of South Korean police officers were men who had served in the National Police during the Japanese occupation.

Political repression 

Soon after taking office, Rhee enacted laws that severely curtailed political dissent. There was much controversy between Rhee and his leftist opponents. Allegedly, many of the leftist opponents were arrested and in some cases killed. The most controversial issue has been Kim Gu's assassination. On 26 June 1949, Kim Gu was assassinated by Ahn Doo-hee, who confessed that he assassinated Kim Gu by the order of Kim Chang-ryong. The assassin was described by the British historian Max Hastings as one of Rhee's "creatures". It soon became apparent that Rhee was a dictator. He allowed the internal security force (headed by his right-hand man, Kim Chang-ryong) to detain and torture suspected communists and North Korean agents. His government also oversaw several massacres, including the suppression of the Jeju uprising on Jeju island, of which South Korea's Truth Commission reported 14,373 victims, 86% at the hands of the security forces and 13.9% at the hands of communist rebels, and the Mungyeong Massacre.

By early 1950, Rhee had about 30,000 alleged communists in his jails, and had about 300,000 suspected sympathizers enrolled in an official "re-education" movement called the Bodo League. When the Communist army attacked from the North in June, retreating South Korean forces executed the prisoners, along with several tens of thousands of Bodo League members.

Korean War 

Both Rhee and Kim Il-sung wanted to unite the Korean peninsula under their respective governments, but the United States refused to give South Korea any heavy weapons, to ensure that its military could only be used for preserving internal order and self-defense. By contrast, Pyongyang was well equipped with Soviet aircraft, vehicle, and tanks. According to John Merrill, "the war was preceded by a major insurgency in the South and serious clashes along the thirty-eighth parallel," and 100,000 people died in "political disturbances, guerrilla warfare, and border clashes".

At the outbreak of war on 25 June 1950, North Korean troops launched a full-scale invasion of South Korea. All South Korean resistance at the 38th parallel was overwhelmed by the North Korean offensive within a few hours.  By 26 June, it was apparent that the Korean People's Army (KPA) would occupy Seoul. Rhee stated, "Every Cabinet member, including myself, will protect the government, and parliament has decided to remain in Seoul. Citizens should not worry and remain in their workplaces." However, Rhee had already left the city with most of his government on 27 June. At midnight on 28 June, the South Korean military destroyed the Han Bridge, thereby preventing thousands of citizens from fleeing. On 28 June, North Korean soldiers occupied Seoul.

During the North Korean occupation of Seoul, Rhee established a temporary government in Busan and created a defensive perimeter along the Naktong Bulge. A series of battles ensued, which would later be known collectively as the Battle of Naktong Bulge. After the Battle of Inchon in September 1950, the North Korean military was routed, and the United Nations (UN)—of whom the largest contingents were the Americans and South Koreans—not only liberated all of South Korea, but overran much of North Korea. In the areas of North Korea taken by the UN forces, elections were supposed to be administered by the United Nations but instead were taken over and administered by the South Koreans. Rhee insisted on Bukjin Tongil – ending war by conquering North Korea, but after the Chinese entered the war in November 1950, the UN forces were thrown into retreat. During this period of crisis, Rhee ordered the December massacres of 1950. Rhee was absolutely committed to reunifying Korea under his leadership and strongly supported MacArthur's call for going all-out against China, even at the risk of provoking a nuclear war with the Soviet Union.

Hastings notes that, during the war, Rhee's official salary was equal to $37.50 (U.S. dollars) per month. Both at the time and since, there has been much speculation about precisely how Rhee managed to live on a salary equivalent to US$37.50 per month. The entire Rhee regime was notorious for its corruption, with everyone in the government from the President downwards stealing as much they possibly could from both the public purse and aid from the United States. The Rhee regime engaged in the "worst excesses of corruption," with the soldiers in the Army of the Republic of Korea (ROK) going unpaid for months as their officers embezzled their pay, equipment provided by the United States being sold on the black market, and the size of the ROK army being bloated by hundreds of thousands of "ghost soldiers" who only existed on paper, allowing their officers to steal pay that would have been due had these soldiers actually existed. The problems with low morale experienced by the ROK army were largely due to the corruption of the Rhee regime. The worst scandal during the war—indeed of the entire Rhee government—was the National Defense Corps Incident. Rhee created the National Defense Corps in December 1950, intended to be a paramilitary militia, comprising men not in the military or police who be drafted into the corps for internal security duties. In the months that followed, tens of thousands of National Defense Corps men either starved or froze to death in their unheated barracks, as the men lacked winter uniforms and food. Even Rhee could not ignore the deaths of so many of the National Defense Corps and ordered an investigation. It was revealed that the commander of the National Defense Corps, General Kim Yun Gun, had stolen millions of American dollars that were intended to heat the barracks and feed and clothe the men. General Kim and five other officers were publicly shot at Daegu on 12 August 1951, following their convictions for corruption.

In the spring of 1951, Rhee—who was upset about MacArthur's dismissal by President Truman—lashed out in a press interview against Britain, whom he blamed for MacArthur's sacking. Rhee was absolutely committed to reunifying Korea under his leadership and strongly supported MacArthur's call for going all-out against China, even at the risk of provoking a nuclear war with the Soviet Union. Rhee declared, "The British troops have outlived their welcome in my country." Shortly thereafter, Rhee told an Australian diplomat about the Australian troops fighting for his country, "They are not wanted here any longer. Tell that to your government. The Australian, Canadian, New Zealand and British troops all represent a government which is now sabotaging the brave American effort to liberate fully and unify my unhappy nation."

Rhee was strongly against the armistice negotiations the U.S. entered into in 1953. Accordingly, in April of the same year, he demanded of President Eisenhower a total withdrawal of his troops from the peninsula if an armistice were to be signed, declaring that the ROK would rather fight on its own than negotiate a cease-fire. He also deliberately carried out some actions that would deter the armistice and reignite conflicts in the region, the most provocative one being his unilateral release of 25,000 prisoners of war in June 1953. Such actions, which hindered the progress of armistice talks, upset China and the North. Moreover, for such unpredictability in his authoritarian leadership, the Truman and Eisenhower administrations considered him one of the "rogue allies" in East Asia and engaged in "powerplay", or the construction of asymmetric alliances, which helped the U.S. maximize economic and political influence over the ROK and increase ROK's dependency on the United States.

On 27 July 1953, at last, "one of the 20th century's most vicious and frustrating wars" came to an end with no apparent victor. Ultimately, the armistice agreement was signed by military commanders from China, North Korea and the United Nations Command, led by the U.S. Its signatories did not include the ROK, however, as Rhee refused to agree to the armistice, and neither was it supposed to be a permanent cease-fire, as a peace treaty was never signed.

Re-election 
Because of widespread discontent with Rhee's corruption and political repression, it was considered unlikely that Rhee would be re-elected by the National Assembly. To circumvent this, Rhee attempted to amend the constitution to allow him to hold elections for the presidency by direct popular vote. When the Assembly rejected this amendment, Rhee ordered a mass arrest of opposition politicians and then passed the desired amendment in July 1952. During the following presidential election, he received 74% of the vote.

Resignation and exile 
After the war ended in July 1953, South Korea struggled to rebuild following nationwide devastation. The country remained at a Third World level of development and was heavily reliant on U.S. aid. Rhee was easily re-elected for what should have been the final time in 1956, since the 1948 constitution limited the president to two consecutive terms. However, soon after being sworn in, he had the legislature amend the constitution to allow the incumbent president to run for an unlimited number of terms, despite protests from the opposition.

In March 1960, the 84-year-old Rhee won his fourth term in office as president. His victory was assured with 100% of the vote after the main opposition candidate, Cho Byeong-ok, died shortly before the 15 March elections.

Rhee wanted his protégé, Lee Ki-poong, elected as Vice President—a separate office under Korean law at that time. When Lee, who was running against Chang Myon (the ambassador to the United States during the Korean War, a member from the opposition Democratic Party) won the vote with a wide margin, the opposition Democratic Party claimed the election was rigged. This triggered anger among segments of the Korean populace on 19 April. When police shot demonstrators in Masan, the student-led April Revolution forced Rhee to resign on 26 April.

On 28 April, a DC-4 belonging to the United States Central Intelligence Agency (CIA), piloted by Captain Harry B. Cockrell Jr. and operated by Civil Air Transport, covertly flew Rhee out of South Korea as protesters converged on the Blue House. During the flight, Rhee and Francesca Donner, his Austrian wife, came up to the cockpit to thank the pilot and crew. Rhee's wife offered the pilot a valuable diamond ring in thanks, which was courteously declined. The former president, his wife, and their adopted son subsequently lived in exile in Honolulu, Hawaii.

Personal life and death 
Rhee was married to Seungseon Park from 1890 to 1910. Park divorced Rhee shortly after the death of their son Rhee Bong-su in 1908, supposedly because their marriage had no intimacy due to his political activities.

In February 1933, Rhee met Austrian Franziska Donner in Geneva. At the time, Rhee was participating in a League of Nations meeting and Donner was working as an interpreter. In October 1934, they were married in New York City. She also acted as his secretary.

Over the years after the death of Bong-su, Rhee adopted three sons. The first was Rhee Un-soo, however, the elder Rhee ended the adoption in 1949. The second adopted son was Lee Kang-seok, eldest son of Lee Ki-poong, who was a descendant of Prince Hyoryeong and therefore a distant cousin of Rhee; but Lee committed suicide in 1960. After Rhee was exiled, Rhee In-soo, who is a descendant of Prince Yangnyeong just like Rhee, was adopted by him as his heir.

Rhee died of a stroke on 19 July 1965. A week later, his body was returned to Seoul and buried in the Seoul National Cemetery.

Legacy 
Rhee's former Seoul residence, Ihwajang(이화장,梨花莊), is currently used for the presidential memorial museum. The Woo-Nam Presidential Preservation Foundation has been set up to honor his legacy. There is also a memorial museum located in Hwajinpo near Kim Il Sung's cottage.

In popular culture 
 Portrayed by Lee Chang-hwan in the 1991–1992 MBC TV series Eyes of Dawn.
 Portrayed by Kwon Sung-deok in the 2006 KBS1 TV series Seoul 1945.
 In the M*A*S*H episode titled "Mail Call, Again", Radar mentions a parade in Seoul due to Syngman Rhee being "elected dictator again."
 Rhee is referenced in the lyrics to singer Billy Joel's 1989 music single, "We Didn't Start the Fire".
Rhee is mentioned in Philip Roth's "I Married A Communist".

Works 
 The Spirit of Independence (독립정신,獨立精神,1904)
Neutrality as influenced by the United States(1912)
 Japan Inside and Out (1941)

See also 

 President of South Korea
 Francesca Donner
 Inha University
 Korean independence movement
 Korean National Association

Notes

References

Further reading 

 Fields, David. Foreign Friends: Syngman Rhee, American Exceptionalism, and the Division of Korea. University Press of Kentucky, 2019, 264 pages, 
 Lew, Yong Ick. The Making of the First Korean President: Syngman Rhee's Quest for Independence (University of Hawai'i Press; 2013); scholarly biography; 576 pages;

External links 

Syngman Rhee's FBI files hosted at the Internet Archive

 
1875 births
1965 deaths
Converts to Methodism
Exiled politicians
First Republic of Korea
George Washington University alumni
Harvard University alumni
House of Yi
19th-century Korean people
Korean expatriates in China
Korean independence activists
Korean nationalists
Korean revolutionaries
Korean torture victims
Liberal Party (South Korea) politicians
Conservatism in South Korea
Far-right politics in South Korea
People from Haeju
People from North Hwanghae
People of the Cold War
Politicide perpetrators
Presidents of South Korea
Prime Ministers of Korea
Princeton University alumni
Sadaejuui
South Korean anti-communists
South Korean expatriates in the United States
South Korean Methodists
Speakers of the National Assembly (South Korea)
Jeonju Yi clan
Burials at Seoul National Cemetery
Politicians of the Korean Empire